Dorothy (McGahee) Braudy is an artist based in Los Angeles.  A graduate of the University of Kentucky, she received a M.F.A. from New York University and taught for many years at Pratt Institute, the University of Maryland, and Goucher College.  Her work, which includes painting, photography, and printmaking, has been shown in New York, Washington, Baltimore, San Francisco, and Los Angeles, and is included in many private and public collections.

Background 

Dorothy Braudy was born in Los Angeles, California and raised in Maysville, Kentucky. She is married to film critic and historian, Leo Braudy. They live and work in Los Angeles, California.

Career

Highlights 

Dorothy Braudy's artwork explores various styles and media with an emphasis on figures and their relation to color and environment.

Her collections '"Signs of Rescue'" (1988) and "Animal Rites" (1994) feature the animal figure and their interactions with not only the human figures in the paintings, but also the engagement of the viewer. In "Animal Rites" shown at Take 2 (a collaborative exhibit between USC's Fisher Gallery and the California African American Museum) visitors peered into the world of zoo animals using a magnifying glass to view their photographs on display.

The human figure and experience is brought to the forefront in "Marking Time" (1995), a biographical snapshot of the artist's life through the recreation of old photographs with oil on canvas paintings. Braudy showed and presented her work on the cross-section between memory and art at Northeastern University's series The Arts of Being: Telling Life Stories Now in 2010.

Dorothy Braudy's photograph series "Sacred L.A" (1995-1997) focuses its lens on the religious aspects of the metropolis that is Los Angeles. The series was featured in the Journal of the American Academy of Religion in 2013.

Shows

One-person Shows 

2010: “Marking Time,” Northeastern University, Boston, Massachusetts
2007: “Double Feature,” Hamilton Galleries, Santa Monica, California
2005: “Marking Time,” Hamilton Galleries, Santa Monica, California
2000: “Finishing the Hat,” Ellen Kim Murphy Gallery, Bergamot Station, Santa Monica
1994: “Animal Rites,” Fisher Museum, University of Southern California, Los Angeles (LAX/94 city-wide biennial show)
1991: 871 Fine Arts Gallery, San Francisco. Private View, Los Angeles.
1988: Orlando Gallery, Sherman Oaks, California.
1986: Orlando Gallery, Sherman Oaks, California. UPB Gallery, Berkeley, California.
1985: Clark County Community College, Las Vegas, Nevada.
1984: Easton Academy of the Arts, Easton, Maryland. UPB Gallery, Berkeley, California.
1982: Mason County Museum, Maysville, Kentucky. Kraushaar Gallery, Goucher College, Baltimore.
1981: B.R.Kornblatt Gallery, Washington, D.C.
1979: B.R.Kornblatt Gallery, Baltimore.
1978: Hogan & Hartson, Washington, D.C. (prints and drawings). Viridian Gallery, New York.
1977: Viridian Gallery, New York.
1976: Columbia University, Graduate School Gallery.
1975: Second Story Spring Street Society, Soho, New York.

Selected Group Shows 
2020: “Alone Together” Viridian Artists Gallery, New York. Collaboration with David Fitzgerald.
2015: “3 Generations” Home Studios, New York, New York.
2011: “Looking In” Hamilton Galleries, Santa Monica, California.
2007: BAU Institute, Hudson, New York.
2005: Art at the Castle, BAU Institute, Otranto, Italy.
2004: Summer Show, BAU Institute, Otranto, Italy.
1996: Contemporary American Artists, U.S. Embassy, Vienna, Austria
1992: 871 Fine Arts gallery, San Francisco.
1991: 871 Fine Arts gallery, San Francisco. New Acquisitions Show, Rutgers University Art Museum.
1989: 871 Fine Arts Gallery, San Francisco. Distinguished Faculty Invitational Show, Towson State University.
1986: UPB Gallery, Berkeley.
1985: Orlando Gallery, Sherman Oaks. Personae: California Figurative Art, Cal State, LA.
1984: Goucher College Centennial Show.
1982: Watercolor Show, Goucher College.
1981: Maryland Arts Council, “Intimate Interiors,” Goucher College.
1979: Baltimore Arts Festival, Maryland Institute of Science.
1977: Faculty Show, Pratt Institute Gallery. Baltimore Museum of Art, Sales and Rental Gallery.
1975: Pratt-Phoenix Gallery, New York. Women’s Interart Center, New York. Manhattan Community College, New York. Pratt Institute Gallery. Teachers College, Columbia University.
1974: Off-Broadway Gallery, New York. Jacques Baruch Gallery, Chicago. Nyack Art Gallery, Nyack, New York.

Artist statement 

"When I started painting in the 1950s, the rule of the land was abstract expressionism. Representational painting of any sort was considered to be a denial of the high calling of the artist. But somehow figures kept creeping into my work and, when I saw a show at the Museum of Modern Art in 1959, featuring the work of Richard Diebenkorn, David Park, and others, I felt even more authorized to find my own way between the figures of representation and the colors, shapes, and patterns of abstraction. Throughout my career I have been interested in capturing fleeting images and aspects of color, light, and shadow as they play across shapes and figures. I like to take something transient—a time of day, a momentary glimpse, a relation between two people—freeze it, and give that experience a resonance and a permanence through the resources available to me in art. In my work, I use a variety of materials and work in different media, but my goal has always been consistently to capture the beauty of everyday color and light. As Stephen Sondheim has written, 'Color and light, there is only color and light.' "

References

External links 
Dorothy Braudy's Website
"Finishing the Hat" Video Interview by Dorothy Lyman in 2000
Lecture at Northeastern University's "Arts of Being" in 2010
  Article on the "Sacred L.A." photo series published in the Journal of the American Academy of Religion in 2013
 Selma R. Holo, "Finishing the Hat: Dorothy Braudy's Artistic Journey," Women's Studies (2003), 883-887.

20th-century American painters
21st-century American painters
American photographers
Living people
American women printmakers
Year of birth missing (living people)
20th-century American printmakers
American women painters
20th-century American women photographers
20th-century American photographers
21st-century American women photographers
21st-century American photographers